Kathryn Hays (born Kay Piper; July 26, 1934 – March 25, 2022) was an American actress, best known for her role as Kim Hughes on the CBS soap opera As the World Turns from 1972 to 2010.

Life and career 
Hays was born Kay Piper in Princeton, Illinois, on July 26, 1934, the only child of Roger and Daisy (Hays) Piper. Her parents divorced shortly after her birth, and Hays was raised by her mother, a bookkeeper and a banker, and her stepfather, salesman Arnold Gottlieb.

She grew up in Joliet.
She took classes at Northwestern University, and worked as a model. In 1962, she changed her name to Kathryn Hays (using her mother's maiden name for her last name).

Hays' first marriage was to Sidney Steinberg in 1957, with whom she had a daughter, Sherri. In 1966, Hays married actor Glenn Ford; the couple divorced in 1969. Her third husband was Wolfgang Lieschke, who was employed in the advertising industry.

Episodic TV work 
Early in her career, Hays made numerous appearances on episodic TV. In a 2010 interview with the website We Love Soaps, Hays said of those appearances: "It was a great time to begin a career. It was when the guest stars on the primetime shows were almost always women. The running star would be a man. The main storyline would be a very rich part to play."

Hays also appeared in films such as Ride Beyond Vengeance (1966) and Counterpoint (1968) and in the TV film Yuma as Julie Williams. In later years, her TV appearances included Law & Order and Law & Order: Special Victims Unit.

Hays appeared on Broadway several times, including a production of Dames at Sea with Bernadette Peters.

As the World Turns 
In 1972, she was cast as Kim Sullivan Hughes on CBS's As the World Turns. She remained with As the World Turns until its final episode on September 17, 2010. The character of Kim was a pivotal heroine on the show for over thirty years. Hays was prominently featured in the 50th anniversary episode of the show, which aired in April 2006.

Prior to her role on As the World Turns, Hays played the role of Leslie Jackson Bauer Norris Bauer R. N. #2 on The Guiding Light.

In May 2020, she appeared in an episode of The Locher Room, a series of YouTube episodes reuniting various soap actors.

Death 
Hays died on March 25, 2022. She had been living in an assisted living facility at the time of her death. Her daughter, Sherri Mancusi, participated in a November 2022 fan tribute on The Locher Room YouTube channel that honored Hays; in the interview, Mancusi said that Hays had dementia in the years prior to her death. "Mom had dementia, that's what killed her and most people who have dementia are good at masking it," Mancusi said. "Mom was an Oscar contender, and she had people with her all day in her home and she was out in Illinois at that point. Having lived with an artist since the day I was born, I know something about artists and it's that they don't retire. She couldn't drive a car at that point or fix a meal or run her own life, but she could still do an interview, or do a show."

Filmography

Film

Television

References

External links 
 
 2008 Interview in the Bureau County Journal

1934 births
2022 deaths
Actresses from Illinois
American soap opera actresses
American television actresses
Actors from Joliet, Illinois
People from Princeton, Illinois
21st-century American women